Sarlacc Pit may refer to:

 The fictional home of Sarlacc, from the Star Wars franchise
 Sarlacc's Pit cave – a cave in British Columbia